{{Infobox election
| election_name = 2018 Perlis state election
| country = Perlis
| type = legislative
| ongoing = 
| previous_election = 2013 Perlis state election
| previous_year = 2013
| previous_mps = Malaysian State Assembly Representatives (2013-)#Perlis
| next_election = 2022 Perlis state election
| next_year = 2022
| next_mps = 
| elected_mps = Malaysian State Assembly Representatives (2018-)#Perlis
| seats_for_election = All 15 seats in the Perlis State Legislative Assembly
| majority_seats = 8
| registered = 150,221
| turnout = 123,036 (85.91%)
| election_date = 9 May 2018
| image1 =  BN
| image1_size = 150px
| leader1 = Azlan Man
| leader_since1 = 2013
| party1 = Barisan Nasional (UMNO)
| color1 = 000080
| leaders_seat1 = Bintong
| last_election1 = 13 seats, 55.37%
| seats_needed1 = | seats_before1 = 13
| seats1 = 10| seat_change1 =  3
| popular_vote1 = 47,151| percentage1 = 39.02%'| swing1 =  16.35%
| image2 =  PH
| image2_size = 150px
| leader2 = Ameir Hassan
| leader_since2 = 30 August 2017
| party2 = Pakatan Harapan (Bersatu)
| colour2 = E21118
| leaders_seat2 = Pauh
| last_election2 = 1 seat, 18.10%   (Pakatan Rakyat)| seats_needed2 =  7
| seats_before2 = 1
| seats2 = 3
| seat_change2 =  2
| popular_vote2 = 42,220
| percentage2 = 34.94%
| swing2 =  16.84%
| image3 =  GS
| image3_size = 150px
| leader3 = Mohd Shukri Ramli
| leader_since3 = 2013
| party3 = Gagasan Sejahtera (PAS)
| colour3 = 009000
| leaders_seat3 = Sanglang
| last_election3 = 1 seat, 23.71%   (Pakatan Rakyat)| seats_needed3 =  7
| seats_before3 = 1
| seats3 = 2
| seat_change3 =  1
| popular_vote3 = 31,335
| percentage3 = 25.93%
| swing3 =  2.22%
| title = Menteri Besar
| before_election = Azlan Man
| before_party = Barisan Nasional
| after_election = Azlan Man
| after_party = Barisan Nasional
| map_image = 
| map_size = 
| map_caption = 
}}

The 14th Perlis State election was held on 9 May 2018. The previous state election was held on 5 May 2013. The state assemblymen is elected to 5 years term each.

The Perlis State Legislative Assembly would automatically dissolve on 28 June 2018, the fifth anniversary of the first sitting, and elections must be held within sixty days (two months) of the dissolution (on or before 28 August 2018, with the date to be decided by the Election Commission), unless dissolved prior to that date by the Head of State (King of Perlis) on the advice of the Head of Government (Menteri Besar of Perlis).

The incumbent party Barisan Nasional won simple majority of 10 seats and was able to form a government. The opposition Pakatan Harapan won 3 seats while Gagasan Sejahtera won 2 seats.

Background
Electoral system
Each state constituencies of Perlis will elect one member to the Perlis State Legislative Assembly using the first-past-the-post voting system. If one party obtains a majority of seats, then that party is entitled to form the State Government, with its leader as Menteri Besar. If the election results in no single party having a majority, there is a hung assembly, of which will be dissolved under the royal prerogative of the Raja.

The redistricting of electoral boundaries for the entire country had been presented to and passed by the Dewan Rakyat'', and subsequently gazetted on 29 March 2018 after obtaining the royal consent of the Yang di-Pertuan Agong ahead of the 14th general election. Elections are conducted by the Election Commission of Malaysia (EC), which is under the jurisdiction of the Prime Minister's Department.

Voting Eligibility

To vote in the state election, one had to be:
 registered in the electoral roll as an elector in the constituency in which he resides on;
 aged 21 or over on the registration date;
 a resident of the constituency, or if not so, an absentee voter;
 not disqualified under any law relating to offences committed in connection with elections.

Contenders

Barisan Nasional (BN) contested in all 15 seats in Perlis State Legislative Assembly. Barisan Nasional (BN) linchpin party United Malays National Organisation (UNMO) contested in 13 seats and Malaysian Chinese Association(MCA) contested in 2 seats.

Pakatan Harapan contested in  all 15 seats in Perlis.

Pan-Malaysian Islamic Party (PAS) also contested in all 15 seats.

Political parties

The contested seats

Election pendulum

The 14th General Election witnessed 10 governmental seats and 5 non-governmental seats filled the Perlis State Legislative Assembly. However, none of the government side has safe and fairly safe seat, while the non-government side has just 1 fairly safe seat.

Results

The result of the election was announced after 5pm on 9 May 2018. Barisan Nasional won 10 out of 15 seats and was entitled to form a government in Perlis.

By parliamentary constituency
Barisan Nasional won 2 of 3 parliamentary constituency.

Seats that changed allegiance

Aftermath

Menteri Besar controversy
Azlan Man from BN was sworn in for his second term as the Menteri Besar on 24 May 2018, but the ceremony was boycotted by other BN MLAs, who named Ismail Kassim as their Menteri Besar choice. The BN state chief, Shahidan Kassim, later that day announced that Azlan was sacked as UMNO and BN member, and become an independent; however Azlan disputes the announcement, saying he had not received official sacking letter from UMNO and he is still with UMNO and BN. The King of Perlis expressed his sadness over the whole situation, and explained his rationale behind decision in accepting Azlan as the Menteri Besar.

The 9 MLAs later retracted their boycott of Azlan and announced their support for him and seeking forgiveness from the King of Perlis, on 5 June 2018. The state EXCO members were sworn in on 13 June 2018, making Perlis the last state in Malaysia to appoint EXCO members after the 2018 election. All BN MLAs were appointed as EXCO members except Ismail, who did not attend the ceremony.

On 20 June 2018, Ismail resigned from UMNO and BN, and became an independent. However he rejoined UMNO on May 2020.

References

Perlis state elections
Perlis
Perlis